The Hyvinkää shooting occurred on 26 May 2012 in the Finnish town of Hyvinkää when 18-year-old Eero Samuli Hiltunen shot and killed two people and wounded seven others with a .22-caliber rifle and a .308-caliber scoped bolt-action hunting rifle.

Details
Around 1:53 a.m., a gunman wearing camouflage clothing opened fire from a low rooftop, aiming at people gathered outside a restaurant. An 18-year-old woman died at the scene, while a 19-year-old man later died in a local hospital; both were students at the Hyria Vocational Institute. The male victim Topi Koistinen (b. 1993), was a pesäpallo player of the Finnish premier division side Hyvinkään Tahko. Two other Tahko players were wounded. Among the wounded was also 24-year-old police officer Heidi Foxell, herself a goalkeeper of the HJK Helsinki women's football squad. 

Some five hours after the shooting, authorities arrested the gunman, identified as 18-year-old Eero Samuli Hiltunen, who had no criminal background and was believed to have acted alone. The only motive given by the gunman was that he lost an impromptu "wrestling match" on the way to a bar with four other men. The gunman had been in psychiatric treatment earlier. Nevertheless, he was found competent to stand trial in a psychiatric evaluation. On 28 February 2013, Hiltunen was sentenced to life imprisonment for the shootings.

On 16 October 2020, Hiltunen escaped from prison after being put on leave. A few hours later, he was recaptured.

Reactions
Finland's President Sauli Niinistö expressed condolences to the family members of the victims. The Finnish pesäpallo league Superpesis cancelled matches of the weekend and the women's football league Naisten Liiga changed its schedule.

References 

Shooting
2012 murders in Europe
Spree shootings in Finland
May 2012 crimes
2012 murders in Finland
Mass shootings in Finland
2012 mass shootings in Europe